Howard Jerome Keisler (born 3 December 1936) is an American mathematician, currently professor emeritus at University of Wisconsin–Madison. His research has included model theory and non-standard analysis.

His Ph.D. advisor was Alfred Tarski at Berkeley; his dissertation is Ultraproducts and Elementary Classes (1961).

Following Abraham Robinson's work resolving what had long been thought to be inherent logical contradictions in the literal interpretation of Leibniz's notation that Leibniz himself had proposed, that is, interpreting "dx" as literally representing an infinitesimally small quantity, Keisler published Elementary Calculus: An Infinitesimal Approach, a first-year calculus textbook conceptually centered on the use of infinitesimals, rather than the epsilon, delta approach, for developing the calculus.

He is also known for extending the Henkin construction (of Leon Henkin) to what are now called Henkin–Keisler models. He is also known for the Rudin–Keisler ordering along with Mary Ellen Rudin.

He held the named chair of Vilas Professor of Mathematics at Wisconsin.

Among Keisler's graduate students, several have made notable mathematical contributions, including Frederick Rowbottom who discovered Rowbottom cardinals.  Several others have gone on to careers in computer science research and product development, including: Michael Benedikt, a professor of computer science at the University of Oxford, Kevin J. Compton, a professor of computer science at the University of Michigan, Curtis Tuckey, a developer of software-based collaboration environments; Joseph Sgro, a neurologist and developer of vision processor hardware and software, and Edward L. Wimmers, a database researcher at IBM Almaden Research Center.

In 2012 he became a fellow of the American Mathematical Society.

His son Jeffrey Keisler is a Fulbright Distinguished Chair at the University of Massachusetts, Boston, College of Management.

Publications
Chang, C. C.; Keisler, H. J. Continuous Model Theory. Annals of Mathematical Studies, 58, Princeton University Press, 1966. xii+165 pp.
Model Theory for Infinitary Logic, North-Holland, 1971
Chang, C. C.; Keisler, H. J. Model theory. Third edition. Studies in Logic and the Foundations of Mathematics, 73. North-Holland Publishing Co., Amsterdam, 1990. xvi+650 pp. ; 1st edition 1973; 2nd edition 1977
Elementary Calculus: An Infinitesimal Approach. Prindle, Weber & Schmidt, 1976/1986.
An Infinitesimal Approach to Stochastic Analysis, American Mathematical Society Memoirs, 1984 
Keisler, H. J.; Robbin, Joel. Mathematical Logic and Computability, McGraw-Hill, 1996 
Fajardo, Sergio; Keisler, H. J. Model Theory of Stochastic Processes, Lecture Notes in Logic, Association for Symbolic Logic. 2002

See also
 Criticism of non-standard analysis
 Non-standard calculus
 Elementary Calculus: An Infinitesimal Approach
 Influence of non-standard analysis

References

External links

Keisler's home page

20th-century American mathematicians
21st-century American mathematicians
Living people
Model theorists
University of Wisconsin–Madison faculty
Fellows of the American Mathematical Society
1936 births
Tarski lecturers